This is a list of Greek Academy Award winners and nominees. It details the performances of Greek filmmakers, actors, actresses and films that have either been nominated for or have won an Academy Award.

Best Picture

Best Director

Best Actor

Best Actress

Best Supporting Actor

Best Supporting Actress

Best Original Screenplay

Best Adapted Screenplay

Best Production Design

Best Cinematography

Best Film Editing

Best Costume Design

Best Original Song

Best Original Score

Best Makeup and Hairstyling

Best Animated Feature

Best Documentary Feature

Best Documentary Short Subject

Best Live Action Short Film

Best Sound

Best Visual Effects

Best Dance Direction

Special Achievement

Best International Feature Film

Nominations and Winners

See also

List of Greek award-winning films in International Film Festivals

References

Greece
Academy Award winners
Academy Award winners